Olivier Jean (born March 15, 1984) is a three time Olympian who represented Canada in both short and long track speed skating. Olivier Jean is a gold medalist from the Vancouver 2010 Olympic Games in the men's 5000m relay. He is a canadian short track speed skater,  racing internationally from 2002 to 2015 and switched to long track speed skating, competing internationally from 2015 to 2018. Olivier competed at his second Olympic Games in Sochi 2014 in short track speed skating, and for his third game appearance, switched to long track speed skating, competing in the mass start at the 2018 Pyeongchang Olympic Games. His appearance is well-known for his dreadlocks and for listening to reggae, which he says makes him skate faster.

Career
Jean skates in every distance for the Canadian team and is a member of the national short track relay team. He helped the team to a silver at the 2007 World Championships. As well Jean skated to a bronze at the recent 2009 World Championships. Olivier Jean is a member of the Canadian team and relay team in the 2010 Winter Olympics in Vancouver. Jean qualified for the 1500m final on February 13 after judges ruled he was interfered with during his semi-final heat. Jean would go on to finish 4th in the final just missing out on a medal. On February 26, he won a gold medal in the 5000 m relay along with Charles Hamelin, François Hamelin, François-Louis Tremblay and Guillaume Bastille.

At the 2012 World Championships Jean won gold in the 500 m, he followed this with a gold medal in the men's relay final where he skated the anchor leg. He also won his first overall medal at the World Championships when he finished with the bronze.

During the 2011 World Team Championships Jean was the victim of a bizarre sabotage event, when American Simon Cho damaged his skate blade after the United States were already eliminated. This caused the Canadians to be unable to skate for gold, leaving them in the bronze position. The events came to light at an inquiry into the actions of U.S. coach Jae Su Chun in 2012.

At the 2017 World Speed Skating Championships in Gangneung, South Korea Jean won a bronze medal at the mass start event.

2018 Olympics
Now solely focused on long track speed skating, Jean after finishing in the top 16 in the mass start event at the 2017–18 ISU Speed Skating World Cup, pre-qualified for the 2018 Winter Olympics in Pyeongchang, South Korea.

External links 
Olivier Jean at ISU

References

1984 births
Living people
Canadian male speed skaters
Canadian male short track speed skaters
Olympic speed skaters of Canada
Olympic gold medalists for Canada
Olympic short track speed skaters of Canada
Olympic medalists in short track speed skating
Short track speed skaters at the 2010 Winter Olympics
Short track speed skaters at the 2014 Winter Olympics
Speed skaters at the 2018 Winter Olympics
Medalists at the 2010 Winter Olympics
World Single Distances Speed Skating Championships medalists
World Short Track Speed Skating Championships medalists
People from Terrebonne, Quebec
21st-century Canadian people